The 1930 Yale Bulldogs football team represented Yale University in the 1930 college football season. In their third year under head coach Mal Stevens, the Bulldogs compiled a 5–2–2 record.

Schedule

References

Yale
Yale Bulldogs football seasons
Yale Bulldogs football